Donny George Youkhanna (Arabic:) (October 23, 1950 – March 11, 2011) was an Iraqi-Assyrian archaeologist, anthropologist, author, curator, and scholar, and a visiting professor at Stony Brook University in New York.

Biography
Youkhanna was born in Habbaniyah, Iraq in 1950 to Assyrian parents from northern Iraq. He moved with his family to Baghdad during his childhood, where he gained his education. He gained a BA, MA, and PhD in prehistoric archaeology at the University of Baghdad. He was fluent in Aramaic, Arabic, and English.

Youkhanna was the Director General of Iraq's National Museum, Chairman of the State Board of Antiquities and Heritage and the President of the Iraq State Board of Antiquities and Heritage. He conducted excavations in the Bekhme Dam area, Nineveh, and Tell Umm al-Aqarib as well as working on many restoration projects in Babylon, Nimrud, Nineveh, Ur and Baghdad. He authored two books on the structural design and stone industries of Tell es Sawwan, and gave  several presentations on the current museum conditions and historical archaeological sites of Iraq.

Dr. George, who dropped his last name for professional purposes, was instrumental in recovering over half of the 15,000 Mesopotamian artifacts looted from the National Museum in Baghdad during the invasion. A majority of the artefacts date back to 6,000 years from the ancient empires of Assyria and Babylonia. He fought his way through to the Iraq National Museum in the days after the American-led invasion of Iraq and tried to stop the looters ransacking it but was unable to persuade American soldiers to protect it because they had been given no orders to do so.

He became the international face of the plight of ancient sites and artefacts in Iraq, many of which were stolen or destroyed during the invasion. In December 2008, Youkhanna was decisive in preventing the sale of royal Neo-Assyrian earrings from the world-famous Nimrud treasures at Christie's art auction in New York.

Due to threats from unknown militia groups during the US occupation of Iraq, Youkhanna was forced to flee Iraq with his family first to Syria and then to the United States in 2006, to take up a position as visiting professor at Stony Brook University in New York.

He died on 11 March 2011 as a result of a heart attack while he was travelling via Toronto Pearson International Airport, Toronto, Ontario, Canada. He was 60.

Education
Bachelor of Arts in Archaeology, University of Baghdad, 1974
Master of Arts in Prehistoric Archaeology, University of Baghdad, 1986
Ph.D. in Prehistoric Archaeology, University of Baghdad, 1995

Career
Member Staff in the Iraqi National Museum, 1976 
Director of Documentation Center, 1980
Field Director for the Restoration Project in Babylon, 1986–87
Archaeological Investigation in the Eastern Wall of Nineveh, 1988
Scientific Super Advisor for Bakhma Dam Archaeological Rescue Project, 1989
Director of Relations, 1990
Director of Documentation Center, 1992
Assistant Director General of Antiquities for Technical Affairs, 1995
Professor in the Department of Archaeology at the University of Baghdad 
Professor in the Department of Archaeology at the Babylon College for Theology and Philosophy 
Director of Excavation Team in the site of Umm al-Aqarib, 1999-2000
Head of the Technical Committee, 1999-2000
Director General of Research and Studies, 2000–03
Director General of the Iraqi Museums, 2003-05 
Member of the International Regional Committee of Interpol, 2003
Member of the Iraqi National Committee for Education, Science, and Culture, Iraqi UNESCO, 2004
Chairman of the Iraqi State Board of Antiquities and Heritage, 2005-06 
Member of the Iraqi Science Academy, Department of the Syriac Language, 2005
Board of Advisors, Assyrian Academic Society

Works

Authored
Co-Author of Photography: The Graves of the Assyrian Queens in Nimrud, 2000
Co-Author of Pots and Pans
Co-Author of The Looting of the Iraq Museum, 2005
Co-Author of The Destruction of the Cultural Heritage in Iraq, 2008 
Co-Author of Antiquities under Siege, Cultural Heritage in Iraq, 2008
Co-Author of Catastrophe, The Looting and Destructions of Iraq's Past, 2008
Author of Architecture of the Sixth Millennium B.C. in Tell Es-Sawwan
Author of The Stone Industries in Tell Es-Sawwan, 'Book in Process'

Publications
Stores in Ancient Mesopotamia, 1985.
A New Acheulian hand Axe from the Iraqi Western Desert in the Iraq Museum, 1993
Proverbs in Ancient Mesopotamia, 1994
The Architecture of the Sixth Millennium BC in Tell Esswwan, 1997
Precision Craftsmanship of the Nimrud Gold Material, 2002
Full Account on the Iraqi Museums and Archaeological sites, 2004

Conferences
Recontre Assyriologic, Heidelberg, Germany, 1992
Recontre Assyriologic, London, UK, 2004
International Conference on the Excavations at the Ancient city of Nimrud, London, 2004
International Conference for the Protection of the Iraqi Antiquities, Istanbul, Turkey, 2004
Interpol International Regional Conference for the Protection of the Iraq Antiquities, Amman, Jordan. 2004
International Council of Museums ICOM Conference, Seoul, South Korea, 2004
Archaeological Institute of America, Boston, USA, 2004
International Conference for the Protection of Iraqi Antiquities, Washington DC, USA, 2005
Iraq Cultural Committee at UNESCO, Paris, France
U.S. Institute of Peace, Washington DC, 2008

Lectures
Belgium: Brussels National Museum
Britain: University of London, the British Museum
Denmark: National Museum in Copenhagen
Germany: University of Berlin, Pergamum Museum, University of Heidelberg, University of Frankfurt, University of Munich, Römisch-Germanisches Zentralmuseum Mainz
Jordan: Department of Antiquities, German Archaeological Institute in Amman
Italy: University of Rome
Japan: University of Kukushikan, Japanese Society for the Antiquities of the Middle East
Spain: University Autónoma de Madrid
Sweden: University of Gothenburg, Museum of World Culture, Museum of Mediterranean and the Middle East
USA: University of Chicago, Harvard University, State University of New York at Stony Brook, Museums of Fine Art in Boston, Pennsylvania Museum, Iraqi Embassy in Washington DC, Yeshiva University, State University of Arizona, South Methodist University in Dallas, Texas, Bowers Museum of Art in Santa Ana, Denver Museum of Science and Nature, South Methodist University in Taos, New Mexico and Crow Canyon Archaeological Center in Cortez, Colorado, CSU Stanislaus, Turlock, Gustavus Adolphus College

References

External links
The Devastation of Iraq's Past

Video Interviews
 Remember Iraq's Heritage, Our Heritage: Donny George's Video
 Daljit Dhaliwal interviews Donny George Youkhanna
 Interview with Cindy Ho at Saving Antiquities
 
 Interview on the Archaeology Channel
 Interview with Charlie Rose

1950 births
2011 deaths
Iraqi anthropologists
Iraqi archaeologists
Iraqi Assyriologists
20th-century Iraqi historians
Writers from Baghdad
Iraqi Assyrian people
University of Baghdad alumni
Stony Brook University alumni
Academic staff of the University of Baghdad
Iraqi Christians
Iraqi curators
21st-century Iraqi writers
20th-century Iraqi writers
Iraqi emigrants to the United States
Assyriologists